Hurricane Municipal Airport , also known as General Dick Stout Field, is a public airport three miles south of Hurricane, in Washington County, Utah. It is owned by the City of Hurricane. The FAA's National Plan of Integrated Airport Systems for 2021–2025 called it a general aviation airport.

Facilities and aircraft 
Hurricane Municipal Airport is at an elevation of 3,352 feet (1,288 m) above mean sea level. Its one runway, 01/19 is 3,282 by 60 feet (1,000 x 18 m) asphalt. The 2020 airport master plan shows a future 718 foot extension of the runway to 4,000 by 60 feet.

References

External links 

 City of Hurricane
 Official website
 

Airports in Utah
Buildings and structures in Washington County, Utah
Transportation in Washington County, Utah